Steve Woodberry (born October 9, 1971) is an American basketball coach and former professional player. He played professionally in the Australian National Basketball League and Europe as a point guard, shooting guard and small forward

Playing career
Woodberry was born in Wichita, Kansas and attended Wichita South High School. He played on two state title teams and was named Kansas Naismith Player of the Year as a senior in 1990.

He then played college basketball with the Kansas Jayhawks and was a part of two Final Four teams at Kansas in 1991 and 1993. Woodberry was named to the second team All-Big Eight in both his junior and senior season.

In 1994 Woodberry won a championship in the Swiss league with Belinzona and then moved to Australia where he played for the Gold Coast Rollers in 1995. In his first season in Australia, Woodberry averaged 24.5 points, 7.4 assists and 7.6 rebounds per game. However, he suffered a training accident and was forced to return to Kansas for intensive training and recovery.

Woodberry returned to Australia in 1996 to play for the Brisbane Bullets. With the Bullets he was the NBL Most Valuable Player in 1999 and was named in the All-NBL First Team in 1998 and 1999. He then played a single season with the Sydney Kings in 2000. During the 1996–97 season, Woodberry played for the Quad City Thunder of the Continental Basketball Association, averaging 9.9 points in 30 games.

Woodberry subsequently spent two seasons playing professionally in Lithuania for Zalgiris Kaunas, which won a Lithuanian championship in 2001 when he was voted the league's Import Player of the Year. He later signed for the Athletic Union of Constantinople in Athens, Greece (2002-2003), but ended season in Lithuania BC Lietuvos Rytas, then joined Jamtland in Sweden (2004) and Honka Espoo in Finland (2004), before retiring as an active player in 2006.

Coaching career
Woodberry was an assistant basketball coach at Missouri State from 2006 to 2012.  He left in 2012 to become an assistant to fellow Kansas alum Danny Manning at Tulsa.  He then followed Manning to Wake Forest in 2014. In 2021, Woodberry became an NBA scout for the Minnesota Timberwolves.

Career statistics

Euroleague

|-
| style="text-align:left;"| 2000–01
| style="text-align:left;"| Žalgiris
| 12 || 12 || 33.8 || .432 || .438 || .750 || 4.8 || 2.8 || 1.6 || .3 || 11.9 || 13.8
|-
| style="text-align:left;"| 2001–02
| style="text-align:left;"| Žalgiris
| 14 || 14 || 31.2 || .496 || .333 || .696 || 4.5 || 3.1 || 1.4 || .1 || 12.5 || 15.1
|-
| style="text-align:left;"| 2002–03
| style="text-align:left;"| AEK Athens
| 1 || 0 || 17.0 || .667 || .000 || .500 || 1.0 || 2.0 || .0 || .0 || 5.0 || 6.0
|- class="sortbottom"
| style="text-align:left;"| Career
| style="text-align:left;"|
| 27 || 26 || 31.9 || .468 || .389 || .711 || 4.5 || 2.9 || 1.4 || .2 || 12.0 || 14.2

References

External links
 Steve Woodberry at euroleague.net
 Steve Woodberry at tulsahurricane.com

1971 births
Living people
AEK B.C. players
American expatriate basketball people in Australia
American expatriate basketball people in Finland
American expatriate basketball people in Greece
American expatriate basketball people in Lithuania
American expatriate basketball people in Sweden
American expatriate basketball people in Switzerland
American men's basketball coaches
American men's basketball players
Basketball players from Wichita, Kansas
BC Rytas players
Brisbane Bullets players
Gold Coast Rollers players
Kansas Jayhawks men's basketball players
Missouri State Bears basketball coaches
Point guards
Quad City Thunder players
Shooting guards
Small forwards
Sydney Kings players
Tulsa Golden Hurricane men's basketball coaches
Wake Forest Demon Deacons men's basketball coaches